Legacy Motor Club, formerly known as Petty GMS Motorsports, is an American professional stock car racing team owned by Maurice J. Gallagher Jr. and Jimmie Johnson that competes in the NASCAR Cup Series where they field the Nos. 42 and 43 Chevrolet Camaro ZL1 for Noah Gragson and Erik Jones, respectively, along with the No. 84 Camaro part-time for team co-owner Johnson. The team has a technical alliance with Richard Childress Racing.

History

On December 1, 2021, Gallagher purchased a majority interest in the former Richard Petty Motorsports for 19 million. The deal included both of RPM's charters; the No. 43 continued to operate with its charter while the second charter - which was leased to Rick Ware Racing for the No. 51 from 2019 to 2021 - was transferred to a second car for the team, the No. 42. Following the purchase, the team was renamed to Petty GMS Motorsports.

On September 16, 2022, Kelly Crandall tweeted that Petty GMS Motorsports will use Joe Gibbs Racing pit crews in 2023.

Following the 2022 season, Richard Petty sold all shares of Petty GMS Motorsports to majority owner Gallagher. 

On November 4, 2022, seven-time NASCAR champion Jimmie Johnson purchased an ownership stake in Petty GMS.

On January 11, 2023, the team announced the rebranding of the organization to Legacy Motor Club, marking the first time since the founding of NASCAR in 1949 that the Petty family has not had their name on a team in NASCAR's top series.   

On February 18, 2023, Richard Petty announced that Jimmie Johnson had taken control of the team's day-to-day operations, leaving Richard Petty without decision-making power.

Cup Series

Car No. 42 history

Ty Dillon (2022)

On June 17, 2021, Gallagher announced that GMS Racing would move up to the NASCAR Cup Series in 2022. On October 10, GMS announced that Ty Dillon would drive the then-No. 94 in their inaugural Cup season. On December 1, Gallagher purchased a majority interest in Richard Petty Motorsports for 19 million. The deal included both of RPM's charters; the No. 43 would continue to operate with its charter while the second charter - which was leased to Rick Ware Racing for the No. 51 from 2019 to 2021 - would be transferred to GMS' entry which was re-numbered from 94 to No. 42.

Dillon began the 2022 season with an 11th place finish at the 2022 Daytona 500. Throughout the season, he only scored a top-10 finish at the Bristol dirt race. On July 15, Dillon announced that he would part ways with Petty GMS at the end of the 2022 season. Prior to the Pocono race, the No. 42 was docked 35 driver and owner points for an L1 penalty when the pre-race inspection revealed issues on the car's rocker box vent hole. At Kansas, the No. 42 began to use pit crew members from Joe Gibbs Racing; both the No. 42 and No. 43 will use JGR pit crew members starting in 2023. Dillon ended the season 29th in the points standings.

Noah Gragson (2023-present)
On August 10, Petty GMS announced that Noah Gragson would replace Dillon for the 2023 season.

Car No. 42 results

Car No. 43 history

Erik Jones (2022–present)

On October 21, 2020, it was announced that Richard Petty Motorsports had signed Erik Jones to a multi-year contract to drive the 43 car. When GMS bought Richard Petty Motorsports in 2021, Jones was retained to drive the 43 car.

Jones began the 2022 season with a 29th place finish at the 2022 Daytona 500. He scored nine top-10 finishes during the season, including a third-place finish at Fontana and a fourth-place finish at Atlanta. Prior to the Pocono race, the No. 43 was docked 35 driver and owner points for an L1 penalty when the pre-race inspection revealed issues on the car's rocker box vent hole. Jones was signed to a multi-year agreement on July 30. Despite not making the playoffs, he won at Darlington, giving Petty GMS its first win. In addition, he gave the No. 43 its first win since 2014 and its overall 200th win. Jones ended the season 18th in the points standings.

Jones started the 2023 season with hard rock band Guns N' Roses sponsoring the No. 43 for the 2023 Daytona 500.

Car No. 43 results

Car No. 84 history
Part Time with Jimmie Johnson (2023)

On January 11, 2023, Legacy Motor Club announced seven time champion Jimmie Johnson will run with a part time schedule in 2023, starting with the 2023 Daytona 500 driving the No. 84 entry. The number is an inverse of Johnson's famous 48 car (still run by Johnson's long-time team Hendrick Motorsports). Johnson also chose the number due to him having 83 wins, and his goal to get one more, which would tie him with Bobby Allison and Darrell Waltrip for fourth all time. On February 14, Johnson made the entry field by scoring the fastest lap among the non-chartered teams.

Car No. 84 results

References

External links

 

American auto racing teams
NASCAR teams
Auto racing teams established in 2021
Companies based in Charlotte, North Carolina
Richard Petty
2021 establishments in North Carolina
Jimmie Johnson